Zhutian railway station is a railway station located in Zhutian Township, Pingtung County, Taiwan. It is located on the Pingtung line and is operated by Taiwan Railways. Zhutian station is the only station located on the Pingtung line where the wooden station building built during Japan's rule over Taiwan, though it is not currently in use.

References

1919 establishments in Taiwan
Railway stations opened in 1919
Railway stations in Pingtung County
Railway stations served by Taiwan Railways Administration